John Kasadha (commonly known as John Blaq (born 16 July 1996) is a Ugandan  musical artist, musician and entertainer. His style is primarily dancehall and afrobeat.

History

Early life and education
Kasadha attended Lwanda Primary School and Hasan Tourabi Primary School for Primary Leaving Examination. In 2012, he joined Bweyogerere Secondary School, where he attained both a UCE and a UACE certificate in 2016 and 2018, respectively.

Musical career
John Blaq broke through in 2018 with his single, "Tukwatagane". The song "Sweet Love" was his first collaboration with Vinka, and was released in December, 2018. His first concert took place in Freedom City, Kampala on 29 November 2019.

Discography 

 Romantic 2018
 Sweet Love ft. Vinka 2018
 Tukwatagane 2018
 Program Ft. VIP Jemo & Mosh Mavoko 2018
 Kyoyoya Ft. Daddy Andre & Prince Omar 2018
 Obubadi 2018
 Makanika 2019
 Maama Bulamu 2019
 Do Dat 2019
 Tewelumya Mutwe 2019
 Ebyalagirwa 2019
 Replace me Ft. Sheebah Karungi & Grenade Official 2019
 Ebintu byo Ft. Ykee Benda 2019
 Tewelumya Mutwe Ft. DJ Shiru &  Jowylanda 2019
 Nekwataako 2020
 Oli Wamanyi Ft. Slim Prince 2020
 Hullo  2020
 Blessed Ft. Levixone 2020
 Mu Lubiri  2020

Endorsements 
In September 2019, Kasadha signed with Pepsi under their promotion of the "Tukonectinge Pepsi" campaign. In 2019, he participated in a campaign for fighting teenage pregnancy.

Honors

References

External links
#Living: One on One with Artiste John Blaq
Featured Pulser: New kid on the Block "John Blaq"

Who is John Blaq: Biography, Profile and Life Story of Kashada John

1996 births
Living people
People from Kampala
21st-century Ugandan male singers
People from Jinja District